Carleigh is a given name. Notable people with the name include:

Carleigh Baker (fl. 21st century), Canadian writer 
Carleigh Williams (born 1992), American football player

See also

Karleigh Osborne (born 1988), English footballer